{{DISPLAYTITLE:C19H26O4}}
The molecular formula C19H26O4 (molar mass: 318.407 g/mol, exact mass: 318.1831 u) may refer to:

 2-Methoxyestriol (2-MeO-E3)
 4-Methoxyestriol (4-MeO-E3)

Molecular formulas